is a one volume prequel manga to the series Shonan Junai Gumi. It was written and illustrated by Tooru Fujisawa shortly before starting work on Great Teacher Onizuka. The manga was serialized in Kodansha's Weekly Shōnen Magazine from June to July 1996 and the collected volume was published in 1997 by Kodansha.

Synopsis
Bad Company is made up of two parts, each dedicated in part to how Eikichi Onizuka and Ryuji Danma meet and get their motorcycles.

Part I
The story is told from Ryuji's point of view, it begins when Ryuji is trying to avoid attending class at his new school and by chance witnesses the end of a fight that Onizuka has just won. Haunted by the demonic expression on his eyes while his face is covered in blood, he becomes obsessed with seeing it again, sure that one day they will have a fight from which only one of them will survive. To his surprise, he discovers that not only he is in the same school as Onizuka but in the same class as well. Wanting to be the strongest in the school, he tries several times to bring out the demon out again, but soon realizes that Onizuka won't be angered by teenage bravado, although the rest of the bad-asses in the school are soon under his command. Ryuji never gets the fight he desires with him (or at least at the level he desires).

Sakura Yamato, a girl in Onizuka's group of friends, tries to show Ryuji Onizuka's true face, and so walks him to the garage where Onizuka, Fukitoshi and Isami are mending a bike they found in a dump, which happens to be the Kawasaki Z400GP that Onizuka drives in the sequels. Sakura tells Ryuji that Onizuka is not the kind of person to be interested in power or who is better, he only wants to have a good time with his friends. Ryuji rejects it at first, again trying to pick a fight but is slowly won over and helps them in repairing the bike. The next day, Sakura, Ryuji and Onizuka have gone for food to celebrate just before trying the bike, but when they are back, the bike has disappeared and Fukitoshi and Isami are beaten on the floor. It turns out that the Skull Gang also had their eyes set on the bike, and so have waited for it to be repaired so they can sell it at a good price. Onizuka quickly goes to recover it, and is followed by Ryuji. Onizuka fights the leader of the Skulls for his bike, but the fight is interrupted by Sakura, who has brought the Running Wild Angels, another bōsōzoku gang, whose leader, Masaki, becomes their role-model. After seeing the fight, Masaki asks Onizuka and the others to ride with them next time they meet.

Part II
The boys have just found a porn magazine vending machine, and are trying to be bold enough to go and buy one, but to no avail, as somebody always passes by. A woman approaches and buys one, with no sign of hesitation, then gets into her car and drives dangerously close to them saying that no one who has seen a woman purchase a porn magazine can be left alive, but then laughs it off as a joke. The woman's name is Natsuki, and she drives them around town. Meanwhile, Ryuji is entranced by her femininity, and as his parents have locked him out of the house, ends up sleeping at her apartment. She tells him that her parents used to do the same thing, and so, they are very similar. The next day she gives him the Honda CBX she used to own. That night they go driving with the Running Wild Angels, everybody is very surprised, Onizuka is jealous and Ryuji leads the way. Masaki recognizes the bike and it turns out that Natsuki used to be one of them.

The next morning Ryuji goes again to Natsuki's house and finds she has been beaten by her boyfriend, Nezu Akira, who also bullies him. Now Ryuji has to pay him an enormous amount of money or he will be killed, since the CBX used to belong to him. After more threats, Ryuji goes again to Natsuki's house, intending to kill him with a suspension bar. He attacks Nezu, who gains the upper hand and is about to kill him, before Natsuki stabs Nezu with a kitchen knife. The police and ambulance arrive, and Natsuki willingly goes with them to serve her time in jail, asking Ryuji to wait for her to get out so they can ride on the CBX together. In the final chapter, having fixed up and taken care of the bike, Ryuji gets a card from Natsuki telling him that she was released because Nezu's injury wasn't serious, and she is now working at a bar in Kichijōji. The manga ends with the gang deciding to travel to Tokyo.

Characters

Publication
Bad Company was serialized in Kodansha's Weekly Shōnen Magazine from June 12 to July 17, 1996; and the collected volume was published in 1997 by Kodansha.

References

External links

1997 manga
1998 films
Great Teacher Onizuka
School life in anime and manga
Shōnen manga
Prequel comics
Live-action films based on manga
Yankī anime and manga
Motorcycling in fiction
One-shot manga
Manga adapted into films
Kanagawa Prefecture in fiction
Films set in Kanagawa Prefecture
Japanese drama films
Japanese teen films